Mellinus imperialis is a species of wasp in the family Crabronidae. It is found in Central America and North America.

References

Crabronidae
Articles created by Qbugbot
Insects described in 1968